Driftwood is a small unincorporated community in northern Alfalfa County, Oklahoma, United States.  A formerly prosperous small rural community, at one time it had two churches, a grocery store, barber shop, gas station with repair shop, grain elevator, two-story school, a telephone office, bank, and post office.  Currently, it is made up of less than a dozen residences - along with a church and cemetery - grouped along both sides of Oklahoma State Highway 8/State Highway 58.

History
Prior to statehood in 1907, all the lands of what was to one day become Alfalfa County were part of the Cherokee Outlet under the control of the Cherokee Nation.  A prominent rancher, Major Andrew Drumm, leased grazing lands from the Cherokee in the 1870s and 1880s at a location between the Salt Fork and Medicine, or Medicine Lodge rivers, from which he operated his  U Ranch.  Starting in 1874, the U Ranch headquarters was located a few miles north of present-day Cherokee, just southeast of Driftwood.

The town of Driftwood was officially incorporated in 1898.  (However, a footnote to the 1930 U.S. Census states that the town was "incorporated from part of Driftwood township in 1924.")  The name "Driftwood" was taken from nearby Driftwood Creek, which empties into the Medicine Lodge River.  Driftwood's post office was established May 12, 1894.  From 1902 to 1906, this post office also served nearby Burlington (then known as Drumm).

In 1901, a stage line was established connecting nearby Kiowa, Kansas with Alfalfa county towns, including Burlington, Driftwood, Cherokee, Yewed, and Augusta.  The county's first railroad, the Choctaw Northern Railroad (later owned by the Chicago, Rock Island, and Pacific) connected Driftwood to the other Alfalfa county towns of Aline, Augusta, Lambert, Ingersoll, Amorita, and on into Kansas.

The little town's population would peak in 1930 with 71 inhabitants.

The railroad line through Driftwood and its neighboring towns was abandoned in 1936.  The town's post office was closed on October 31, 1959.  Its population was listed as 32 in 1963.  In the 1960s, the local schools from the towns of Driftwood, Byron, Amorita, and Burlington were all consolidated into the Burlington School District located in nearby Burlington.  After the abandoning of its only rail line, the declining population had made it increasingly difficult to sustain educational and city services so that  by 1980, Driftwood was no longer incorporated.  By the 1990 census, its population had dwindled to just 27 persons.

Geography

The U.S. Geological Survey cites Driftwood's latitude as 36°52′45″N (36.8791951) and its longitude as 98°21′34″W (-98.3595173) with an elevation of 1191 feet.

Notable people
R. Orin Cornett (1913 – 2002) was born in Driftwood on November 14, 1913.  Cornett earned his doctorate of physics and applied mathematics from the University of Texas in 1940 and taught physics, mathematics, and electronics at Oklahoma Baptist, Penn State, and Harvard universities.  He was the inventor of the system of communication for the deaf known as Cued Speech.  He also served in education administration as a vice president at Oklahoma Baptist University and in various positions including the Vice President of Long Range Planning for Gallaudet University.

Other links
 Andrew Drumm Institute
 List of ghost towns in Oklahoma

References

Further reading

 Cornett, Essie Richardson, The Cornett family, Vantage Press (1971), (https://books.google.com/books?id=s2ZHAAAAMAAJ&dq=driftwood%2C+oklahoma&focus=searchwithinvolume&q=driftwood)
 Halcomb, Nora Caroline Williams, Williams history and genealogy, Medford Print. and Pub. (1946), (https://books.google.com/books?id=JYlbAAAAMAAJ&dq=driftwood%2C+oklahoma&focus=searchwithinvolume&q=driftwood)
 McGlasson, Bob, Genealogical and Other Stories on the Ancestors, Patriarchs, Famous and Infamous Characters in the Parental Families of Bob & Willie : McGlasson, Williams, Hullet, Weems, University of Wisconsin - Madison (1994), (https://books.google.com/books?id=27Y0AAAAMAAJ&q=%22Driftwood,+Oklahoma%22&dq=%22Driftwood,+Oklahoma%22&client=internal-uds&num=8&cd=6&source=uds)

External links
 Driftwood Christian Church
 Driftwood Cemetery

Unincorporated communities in Alfalfa County, Oklahoma
Unincorporated communities in Oklahoma